James Graham, 3rd Duke of Montrose, KG, KT, PC (8 September 1755 – 30 December 1836), styled Marquess of Graham until 1790, was a Scottish nobleman and statesman.

Background
Montrose was the son of William Graham, 2nd Duke of Montrose, and Lady Lucy Manners, daughter of John Manners, 2nd Duke of Rutland.

Political career
Montrose was Member of Parliament for Richmond from 1780, and for Great Bedwyn from 1784 to 1790, when he succeeded his father in the dukedom. According to Robert Bain, Scotland can thank him for the repeal in 1782 of the Dress Act 1746 prohibiting the wearing of tartans. He served as a Lord of the Treasury from 1783 to 1789, and as co-Paymaster of the Forces from 1789 to 1791. He was appointed a Privy Counsellor and Vice-President of the Board of Trade in 1789. He was Master of the Horse from 1790 to 1795, and from 1807 to 1821, Commissioner for India from 1791 to 1803, Lord Justice General of Scotland from 1795 to 1836, President of the Board of Trade from 1804 to 1806, Lord Chamberlain from 1821 to 1827 and from 1828 to 1830.

He was appointed a Knight of the Thistle in 1793, resigning from the Order when appointed a Knight of the Garter in 1812. He was Chancellor of the University of Glasgow from 1780 to 1836, Lord Lieutenant of Huntingdonshire from 1790 to 1793, Lord Lieutenant of Stirlingshire from 1795 until his death, and Lord Lieutenant of Dumbartonshire from 1813 until his death.

Graham was a very effective member of the House of Commons, especially when speaking on Scottish topics. Early in his career as a minister under William Pitt the Younger, Graham was attacked in the Rolliad:

——Superior to abuse,
He nobly glories in the name of GOOSE;
Such Geese at Rome from the perfidious Gaul
Preserv'd the Treas'ry-Bench and Capitol, &c. &c.

Family
Montrose was twice married. He married firstly Lady Jemima Ashburnham, daughter of John Ashburnham, 2nd Earl of Ashburnham, in 1785. After her death in September 1786, aged 24 (following the death of a son, who died as an infant), he married secondly Lady Caroline Montagu, daughter of George Montagu, 4th Duke of Manchester, in 1790. They had six children. Montrose died in December 1836, aged 81, and was succeeded in the dukedom by his son, James. The Duchess of Montrose died in March 1847, aged 76.

References

1755 births
1836 deaths
18th-century Scottish people
19th-century Scottish people
British MPs 1780–1784
British MPs 1784–1790
Montrose, 3rd Duke of
203
Knights of the Garter
Knights of the Thistle
Lord-Lieutenants of Dunbartonshire
Lord-Lieutenants of Huntingdonshire
Lord-Lieutenants of Stirlingshire
Lords Justice-General
Graham, James Graham, Marquess of
Members of the Privy Council of Great Britain
Graham, James Graham, Marquess of
United Kingdom Postmasters General
Presidents of the Board of Trade
Members of Parliament for Great Bedwyn